Cash Truck is a 2004 French action thriller film directed by Nicolas Boukhrief, who co-wrote the script with Eric Besnard. It was remade in English by director Guy Ritchie in 2021 as Wrath of Man.

Plot 

Fear and uncertainty prevail in the money transport company Vigilante. Three of the transports have recently been robbed and the guards killed. The perpetrators were able to escape undetected every time. It always seems to be the same gang. It is clear to the employees that there must be a mole in their company. In addition, the company will soon be bought by a U.S. company in a month. However, it is not yet clear who will be retained and who will lose his job.

In this situation, Alexandre Demarre is hired as a new employee. At first he is watched suspiciously by his colleagues, but when he proves himself in a robbery and fends off the assailants, he is welcomed into the group. His living conditions remain a mystery, however, as he doesn't let anyone get close to him. Alexandre has repeated attacks of epilepsy, but he can hide them well from his colleagues. In his hotel room he has pinned photos and files about the Vigilante employees onto a wall.

A flashback explains the reason for his actions: he and his son accidentally witnessed a robbery on a company money transport. His son was shot in cold blood by a masked perpetrator, while he barely survived the attack. Now he wants to avenge the murder of his son. He promised that to his wife, who has been committed to a psychiatric clinic ever since.

When the gangsters attempt to rob Vigilante's vaults in a final coup, it comes to a big showdown. Alexandre and the loyal staff overwhelm and kill the criminals amidst great carnage. After the battle, Alexandre, seriously injured, drives to the spot where his son was shot and lies down by the roadside to die.

Cast 
 Albert Dupontel as  Alexandre Demarre
 Jean Dujardin as  Jacques
 François Berléand as  Bernard
 Claude Perron as  Nicole
 Philippe Laudenbach as  The Mummy
 Nicolas Marié as  The Boss
 Julien Boisselier as  The Weasel
 Alban Lenoir as  Gunman

Remake

In October 2019 it was announced that Guy Ritchie would write and direct an English language remake of the film starring Jason Statham. The remake, titled Wrath of Man, was released on 7 May 2021.

References

External links 

2004 thriller drama films
2004 films
French action thriller films
French thriller drama films
Films directed by Nicolas Boukhrief
2004 drama films
2000s French films